John Henry Matthews IV (1888 – July 7, 1956) was the Mayor of Brantford, Ontario, Canada (1946–1947),

Known as Jack to his friends, he married in 1914 to Florence Honoura Yeune. They had ten children. He was a lithographer with the Brantford Expositor. He was involved in many political situations including losing his deposit as a CCF candidate.

External links
Brief biography of John H. Matthews

Mayors of Brantford
Businesspeople from Ontario
Southern Methodist University alumni
1888 births
1956 deaths
Canadian lithographers